The American Writing Paper Company was an American pulp and paper producing company trust, primarily manufacturing printing and writing paper. Incorporated in New Jersey in 1899 and representing the merging of 23 rag paper mills, the company held its general offices in Holyoke, Massachusetts which was also the location of 13 of these mills. At its peak output American Writing Paper produced 75% of all fine papers in the United States; contemporary accounts describe it as the largest producer of fine papers in the world.

The company's failings have been described by historical scholars, including Constance McLaughlin Green, as a matter of a lack of technical expertise in management. Rather than forming from within the paper industry, “both the original promoters [of the trust] and the final agents were brokers and not paper manufacturers. The result was that these men were primarily interested in marketing the stocks and bonds, and not one was concerned with the manufacture of paper.” Initially the company board sought papermaker and former congressman William Whiting II to serve as its chief executive. Whiting would decline their offer, and indeed the company was unable to absorb his own namesake company, which would become the largest independent manufacturer of writing paper in the United States contemporarily with the trust.

The American Writing Paper Company would endure multiple labor strikes and two bankruptcies before being entirely liquidated under the name "Holyoke Shares", beginning with reorganization as an investment company under that name in 1963, dissolving by the end of 1970. Today it is best known for its "Eagle A" brand which has since been sold to multiple successors, until it was discontinued in 2007 by the Neenah Paper Company.

Merged properties
The mills and properties which the company assumed included but were not limited to-

See also
 American Pad and Paper Company
 International Paper, competitor, and present largest producer of paper and pulp in the world; whose founding chief engineer was an apprentice of D. H. & A. B. Tower, the architectural firm of the majority of American Writing Paper's mills

References

External links

 American Writing Paper Company Collection, Special Collections and University Archives, University of Massachusetts Amherst
 Discovering New Facts About Paper, promotional literature by the American Writing Paper Company

1899 establishments in New Jersey
1899 establishments in Massachusetts
Manufacturing companies established in 1899
Manufacturing companies disestablished in 1970
Manufacturing companies based in Massachusetts
Defunct companies based in Massachusetts
Pulp and paper companies of the United States
Companies based in Holyoke, Massachusetts
Papermaking in the United States
American companies established in 1899
American companies disestablished in 1970